is a Japanese professional footballer who plays as a left winger for V-Varen Nagasaki.

References

External links

1995 births
Living people
Japanese footballers
Association football midfielders
V-Varen Nagasaki players
J1 League players
J2 League players
Sportspeople from Fukuoka (city)
21st-century Japanese people